Michael Africk (born 20 August 1975) is an American singer, songwriter, multi-platinum record producer and software entrepreneur. After signing with  Disney's Hollywood Records and releasing a solo album in 1999, he toured with N'Sync and Britney Spears. He collaborated with Mai Kuraki on several singles, including the platinum Never Gonna Give You Up. Africk also collaborated with her on the album Delicious Way which debuted at number one on the Oricon Albums Chart and had the highest first week sales for a debut album in Japanese music history and sixth overall. In 2011, Africk released his second studio album with Japanese record label Northern Music/Being Music. The album was co-produced by Africk and Louis Bell.

Since 2006, he has founded several mobile software companies, most notably Inmoji in 2014.

Career

Musician 

Africk sang "Someone Like Me", the theme song for Disney's animated film Doug's 1st Movie in 1999. The song was written by William Squier and Jeffrey Lodin, and featured the Boston Symphony Orchestra. In the same year, he released his 11-track self-titled album.

Africk was the opening act for N'Sync and Britney Spears, and toured in Japan. He composed the music for the Japanese anime series Secret of Cerulean Sand (2002). "What Can I Do", his song for the final credits, features Mai Kuraki.

Africk collaborated with Mai Kuraki for the song Baby Tonight, a single from the album Delicious Way. The album debuted at number one on the Oricon Albums Chart with 2,218,640 units sold, making it the highest first week sales for a debut album in Japanese music history and sixth overall. He collaborated with Kuraki on other songs, including Never Gonna Give You Up from the same album. The song was certified Platinum by the Recording Industry Association of Japan (RIAJ). He composed "Love One Another" with Kuraki for the benefit of the 2011 Tōhoku earthquake and tsunami victims. The song, featuring his vocals, was released on his self-titled album and Kuraki's album Over the Rainbow in 2012.

Software entrepreneur 

In 2006, Africk started his tech career when he co-founded XLR8 Mobile. He would go on to found Dijit, Echotag, and Openboard as well.

Africk founded Inmoji with Perry Tell in Boston in May 2014. Inmoji is a software company offering a software development kit to messaging apps and an extension for smartphones that both create clickable icons that enable users to share their favorite brands, products, and experiences directly within the apps without leaving the message. Inmoji raised $2.5 million in seed funding in 2015 and $6.5 million in Series A round in 2016.

Africk was named one of the 12 Top Tech Leaders To Watch In 2017 by Inc.

Discography

Albums

Singles

Featured artist

Composer

Music videos

Accolades

Japan Gold Disc Awards

References

External links
 

Living people
1975 births
American singer-songwriters
American male singer-songwriters
21st-century American male singers
21st-century American singers